"A Defense of Abortion" is a moral philosophy essay by Judith Jarvis Thomson first published in Philosophy & Public Affairs in 1971. Granting for the sake of argument that the fetus has a right to life, Thomson uses thought experiments to argue that the right to life does not include, entail, or imply the right to use someone else's body to survive and that induced abortion is therefore morally permissible. Thomson's argument has many critics on both sides of the abortion debate, yet it continues to receive defense. Thomson's imaginative examples and controversial conclusions have made "A Defense of Abortion" perhaps "the most widely reprinted essay in all of contemporary philosophy".

Overview of the essay

The violinist

In "A Defense of Abortion", Thomson grants for the sake of argument that the fetus has a right to life, but defends the permissibility of abortion by appealing to a thought experiment:

Thomson argues that one can now permissibly unplug oneself from the violinist even though this will cause his death: this is due to limits on the right to life, which does not include the right to use another person's body, and so by unplugging the violinist, one does not violate his right to life but merely deprives him of something – the use of someone else's body – to which he has no right. "[I]f you do allow him to go on using your kidneys, this is a kindness on your part, and not something he can claim from you as his due."

For the same reason, Thomson says, abortion does not violate the fetus's legitimate right to life, but merely deprives the fetus of something – the non-consensual use of the pregnant woman's body and life-supporting functions – to which it has no right. Thus, by choosing to terminate her pregnancy, Thomson concludes that a pregnant woman does not normally violate the fetus's right to life, but merely withdraws its use of her own body, which usually causes the fetus to die.

Third-party participation – the "expanding child"

Thomson criticizes the common method of deducing a woman's right to abort from the permissibility of a third party committing the abortion. In most instances, a woman's right to abortion may hinge on the doctor's willingness to perform it. If the doctor refuses, then the pregnant woman is denied her right. To base the pregnant woman's right on the accordance or refusal of a doctor, she argues, is to ignore the pregnant woman's full personhood, and subsequently, her right to her own body. Thomson presents the hypothetical example of the 'expanding child':

Thomson concedes that a third party indeed cannot make the choice to kill either the person being crushed or the child. However, this does not mean that the person being crushed cannot act in self-defense and attack the child to save his or her own life. To liken this to pregnancy, the mother can be thought to be the person inside the house, the fetus the growing child. In such a case, the mothers's life is being threatened, and the fetus is the one who threatens it. Because for no reason should the pregnant woman's life be threatened, and also for no reason is the fetus threatening it, both are innocent, and thus no third party can intervene. But, Thomson asserts, the person threatened can intervene, by which justification a mother can rightfully abort.

Continuing, Thomson returns to the 'expanding child' example and points out:

If we say that no one may help the mother obtain an abortion, we fail to acknowledge her right over her own body (or property). Thomson says that we are not personally obligated to help the pregnant woman, though this does not rule out the possibility that someone else may act. As Thomson reminds, the house belongs to the pregnant woman; similarly, the body which holds a fetus also belongs to her.

Pregnancy resulting from voluntary intercourse – "people-seeds"

To illustrate an example of pregnancy due to voluntary intercourse, Thomson presents the 'people-seeds' situation:

In this example, the people-seeds flying through the window represent conception, despite the precautionary mesh screen, which functions as contraception. The woman in question does not want a people-seed to root itself in her house, and so she takes the necessary precautions and measures to protect herself with the best mesh screens, and then voluntarily opens the windows. However, in the event that a single people-seed finds its way through the window screens, unwelcome as it may be, does the simple fact that the woman knowingly risked such an occurrence when opening her window deny her the ability to rid her house of the intruder? Thomson notes that some may argue the affirmative to this question, claiming that "... after all you could have lived out your life with bare floors and furniture, or with sealed windows and doors". But by this logic, she says, any woman could avoid pregnancy due to rape by simply having a hysterectomy – an extreme procedure simply to safeguard against such a possibility. Thomson concludes that although there may be times when the fetus  have a right to the pregnant woman's body, certainly in most cases the fetus does not have a right to her body. This analogy raises the issue of whether all abortions are  killing.

Caveats 
Thomson does not support abortion in all circumstances, she gives as an example a hypothetical woman who seeks a late termination of pregnancy; "just to avoid the nuisance of postponing a trip abroad" and declares this to be "positively indecent". 

Thomson also explicitly rejects the claim that pregnant women have a right to kill their offspring. She argues for the right of the pregnant woman to stop being pregnant, even if this results in the death of the offspring, but not for the right to ensure that the offspring is dead. If, for example, a late-term abortion accidentally results in the birth of a living baby, then Thomson would conclude that the mother has no right to kill the baby.

Criticism

Critics of Thomson's argument generally grant the permissibility of unplugging the violinist, but seek to block the inference that abortion is permissible by arguing that there are morally relevant differences between the violinist scenario and typical cases of abortion. One notable exception to this general agreement is Peter Singer, who argues that, despite our intuitions, a utilitarian calculus implies that one is morally obliged to stay connected to the violinist.

The most common objection is that Thomson's violinist argument can justify abortion only in cases of rape, though Thomson uses separate analogies to argue in cases other than rape. In the violinist scenario, the pregnant woman was kidnapped: she did not consent to having the violinist plugged into her and she did nothing to cause the violinist to be plugged in, just as a woman who is pregnant due to rape did nothing to cause the pregnancy. But in some cases of abortion, the pregnant woman had voluntary intercourse, and thus has either tacitly consented to allow the fetus to use her body (the tacit consent objection), or else has a duty to sustain the fetus because the pregnant woman herself caused the fetus to stand in need of her body (the responsibility objection). Other common objections turn on the claim that the fetus is the pregnant woman's child, whereas the violinist is a stranger (the stranger versus offspring objection), or that abortion directly and intentionally kills the fetus, whereas unplugging the violinist merely lets him die of natural causes (the killing versus letting die objection).

Defenders of Thomson's argument reply that the alleged disanalogies between the violinist scenario and typical cases of abortion do not matter, either because the factors that critics appeal to are not genuinely morally relevant, or because those factors are morally relevant but do not apply to abortion in the way that critics have claimed. Thomson's defenders also point to her 'people-seeds' argument as a strong analogy to typical cases of abortion.

Thomson's article, by positing a moral justification for abortion even if one grants a fetal right to life, opened up a new avenue in the philosophical debate about the ethics of abortion. Critics of her view have formulated many objections to her argument, and defenders have responded in kind in a back and forth that continues in philosophy journals.

See also
 Philosophical aspects of the abortion debate – for more detail about how this debate has progressed beyond Thomson's article

Notes

Bibliography

Further reading

External links
A Defense of Abortion, full text

1971 essays
American essays
Ethics essays
Non-fiction literature about abortion
Thought experiments